Gottfried von Meiss (22 September 1909 – 22 December 2000) was a Swiss fencer. He competed at the 1936 and 1948 Summer Olympics.

References

External links
 

1909 births
2000 deaths
Swiss male fencers
Olympic fencers of Switzerland
Fencers at the 1936 Summer Olympics
Fencers at the 1948 Summer Olympics